The 1998 CONCACAF Gold Cup Final was a soccer match to determine the winners of the 1998 CONCACAF Gold Cup. The match was held at the Los Angeles Memorial Coliseum in Los Angeles, United States, on February 15, 1998, and was contested by the winners of the semi-finals, the United States and Mexico. Mexico, who had won both 1993 CONCACAF Gold Cup and 1996 tournaments, successfully defended their title with a 1–0 win over North American rivals United States.

Because Mexico were the hosts of the 1999 FIFA Confederations Cup, the United States qualified to the tournament as runners-up. Mexico would go on to win that tournament beating Brazil 4–3, the United States exited in the semi-finals after a 1–0 loss from an extra time golden goal from Mexico.

Route to the final

Match

References

External links 
 Official website 

Final
CONCACAF Gold Cup finals
CONCACAF Gold Cup Final
CONCACAF Gold Cup Final
Mexico national football team matches
United States men's national soccer team matches
Mexico–United States soccer rivalry
CONCACAF Gold Cup Final
CONCACAF Gold Cup Final
CONCACAF Gold Cup Final
Exposition Park (Los Angeles neighborhood)